Legler's stream frog (Ptychohyla legleri)  is a species of frogs in the family Hylidae found in Costa Rica and Panama. Its natural habitats are subtropical or tropical moist lowland forests, subtropical or tropical moist montane forests, and rivers. It is threatened by habitat loss.

It is named after John M. Legler, a herpetologist at the University of Kansas.

References

Ptychohyla
Amphibians described in 1958
Taxonomy articles created by Polbot